The 32nd Cannes Film Festival was held from 10 to 24 May 1979. The Palme d'Or went to Apocalypse Now by Francis Ford Coppola, which was screened as a work in progress, and Die Blechtrommel (The Tin Drum) by Volker Schlöndorff.

The festival opened with Hair, directed by Miloš Forman and closed with À nous deux, directed by Claude Lelouch.

Françoise Sagan, the President of the Jury raised a controversy as she complained that Robert Favre Le Bret, director of the Festival, had stepped out of his role and had put pressure on the jury for the choice of Coppola's film, while she had defended The Tin Drum to the last minute of the competition. Finally the Palme d'Or was given to both films.

Jury 
The following people were appointed as the Jury of the 1979 feature film competition:

Feature films
Françoise Sagan (France) Jury President
Sergio Amidei (Italy)
Rodolphe-Maurice Arlaud (Switzerland)
Luis García Berlanga (Spain)
Maurice Bessy (France)
Paul Claudon (France)
Jules Dassin (USA)
Zsolt Kézdi-Kovács (Hungary)
Robert Rozhdestvensky (Soviet Union) (author)
Susannah York (UK)

Official selection

In competition - Feature film
The following feature films competed for the Palme d'Or:

Apocalypse Now by Francis Ford Coppola
Arven by Anja Breien
The Bronte Sisters (Les Soeurs Brontë) by André Téchiné
The China Syndrome by James Bridges
Days of Heaven by Terrence Malick
Dear Father (Caro papà) by Dino Risi
The Europeans by James Ivory
Hungarian Rhapsody (Magyar rapszódia) by Miklós Jancsó
The Hussy (La drôlesse) by Jacques Doillon
My Brilliant Career by Gillian Armstrong
Norma Rae by Martin Ritt
Occupation in 26 Pictures (Okupacija u 26 slika) by Lordan Zafranović
Série noire by Alain Corneau
Siberiade by Andrei Konchalovsky
The Survivors (Los sobrevivientes) by Tomás Gutiérrez Alea
The Tin Drum (Die Blechtrommel) by Volker Schlöndorff
Traffic Jam (L'ingorgo - Una storia impossibile) by Luigi Comencini
Victoria by Bo Widerberg
Without Anesthesia (Bez znieczulenia) by Andrzej Wajda
Woman Between Wolf and Dog (Een vrouw tussen hond en wolf) by André Delvaux
Woyzeck by Werner Herzog

Un Certain Regard
The following films were selected for the competition of Un Certain Regard:

 Come and Work (Fad'jal) by Safi Faye
 Companys, procés a Catalunya by Josep Maria Forn
 Encore un Hiver by Françoise Sagan
 From the Cloud to the Resistance (Dalla nube alla resistenza) by Jean-Marie Straub and Danièle Huillet
 Moments (Moments de la vie d'une femme) by Michal Bat-Adam
 A Nice Neighbor (A kedves szomszéd) by Zsolt Kézdi-Kovács
 Les petites fugues by Yves Yersin
 Printemps en Février by Shei Tieli
 A Scream from Silence (Mourir à tue-tête) by Anne Claire Poirier
 Spirit of the Wind by Ralph Liddle
 The Third Generation (Die dritte Generation) by Rainer Werner Fassbinder
 Ward Six (Paviljon VI) by Lucian Pintilie

Films out of competition
The following films were selected to be screened out of competition:

 Christ Stopped at Eboli (Cristo si è fermato a Eboli) by Francesco Rosi
 Hair by Miloš Forman
 Manhattan by Woody Allen
 Le Musee du Louvre by Toshio Uruta
 Orchestra Rehearsal (Prova d'orchestra) by Federico Fellini
 Us Two (À nous deux) by Claude Lelouch
 Wise Blood by John Huston

Short film competition
The following short films competed for the Short Film Palme d'Or:

Barbe bleue by Olivier Gillon
Bum by Břetislav Pojar
La Dame de Monte Carlo by Dominique Delouche
La Festa dels bojos by Lluis Racionero Grau
Harpya by Raoul Servais
Helping Hand by John P. Taylor, Zlatko Pavlinovic
Le Mur by Jan January Janczak
Petite histoire un peu triste by Didier Pourcel
Põld by Rein Raamat
The Waltzing Policemen by Kerry Feltham
Zwei Frauen in der Oper by Christian Veit-Attendorff

Parallel sections

International Critics' Week
The following feature films were screened for the 18th International Critics' Week (18e Semaine de la Critique):

 Fremd bin ich eingezogen by Titus Leber (Austria)
 Jun by Hiroto Yokoyama (Japan)
 Northern Lights by John Hanson, Rob Nilsson (United States)
 La Rabi by Eugeni Anglada (Spain)
 Les Servantes du bon dieu by Diane Létourneau (Canada)
 The Tall Shadows of the Wind (Sayehaye bolande bad) by Bahman Farmanara (Iran)

Directors' Fortnight
The following films were screened for the 1979 Directors' Fortnight (Quinzaine des Réalizateurs):

 Angi Vera by Pal Gabor
 Bastien, Bastienne by Michel Andrieu
 Black Jack by Ken Loach
 Caniche by Bigas Luna
 Chrissomaloussa by Tony Lycouressis
 Cronica de um Industrial by Luis Rosemberg
 Julio Begins in July (Julio Comienza en Julio) by Silvio Caiozzi
 The Management Forgives a Moment of Madness (La empresa perdona un momento de locura) by Mauricio Walerstein
 La Mémoire Courte by Eduardo de Gregorio
 Nighthawks by Ron Peck
 Old Boyfriends by Joan Tewkesbury
 Five Evenings (Пять вечеров, Piats Vetcherov) by Nikita Mikhalkov
 Rockers by Theodoros Bafaloukos
 Those Wonderful Movie Cranks (Báječní muži s klikou) by Jiri Menzel
 Tiro by Jacob Bijl
 To Be Sixteen (Avoir 16 ans) by Jean Pierre Lefebvre
 Zmory (Nightmares) by Wojciech Marczewski

Short films

 Combattimento by Anna Kendall
 Idila by Aleksandar Ilić
 Panoplie by Philippe Gaucherand
 Romance by Yves Thomas
 Vereda Tropical by Joaquim Pedro de Andrade

Awards

Official awards
The following films and people received the 1979 Official selection awards:
Palme d'Or:
Apocalypse Now by Francis Ford Coppola
Die Blechtrommel by Volker Schlöndorff
Grand Prix: Siberiade by Andrei Konchalovsky
Best Director: Terrence Malick for Days of Heaven
Best Actress: Sally Field for Norma Rae
Best Actor: Jack Lemmon for The China Syndrome
Best Supporting Actress: Eva Mattes for Woyzeck
Best Supporting Actor: Stefano Madia for Dear Father (Caro papà)
Golden Camera
Caméra d'Or: Northern Lights by John Hanson and Rob Nilsson
Short films
Short Film Palme d'Or: Harpya by Raoul Servais
Jury Prize- animation: Bum by Břetislav Pojar
Jury Prize- fiction: La Festa dels bojos by Lluis Racionero Grau

Independent awards
FIPRESCI Prizes
 Apocalypse Now by Francis Ford Coppola (In competition)
 Black Jack by Ken Loach (Directors' Fortnight)
 Angi Vera by Pál Gábor (Directors' Fortnight)
Commission Supérieure Technique
 Technical Grand Prize: Norma Rae by Martin Ritt
Ecumenical Jury
 Prize of the Ecumenical Jury: Without Anesthesia by Andrzej Wajda
 Ecumenical Jury - Special Mention: Arven by Anja Breien
Young Cinema Award
Prix du jeune cinéma: The Hussy (La drôlesse) by Jacques Doillon
Other awards
Honorary Award: "Hommage à Miklós Jancsó" for all his work

References

Media
INA: Selection of the 1979 Festival (commentary in French)
INA: Lauren Bacall and Yves Montand special guests at the opening gala 1979 (commentary in French)

External links 

1979 Cannes Film Festival (web.archive)
Official website Retrospective 1979 
Cannes Film Festival Awards for 1979 at Internet Movie Database

Cannes Film Festival, 1979
Cannes Film Festival, 1979
Cannes Film Festival